Sari Guni (also Romanized as Sarī Gūnī; also known as Sar Gūnī) is a village in Sahandabad Rural District, Tekmeh Dash District, Bostanabad County, East Azerbaijan Province, Iran. At the 2006 census, its population was 50, in 10 families.

References 

Populated places in Bostanabad County